Subconscious is the second studio album from American singer Samantha James under the label Om Records. The album was released on June 22, 2010, featuring the first single "Waves of Change", produced by Kaskade.

Background
James considers this record a "miracle" after experiencing emotional distress, due to her father's death from cancer, and a bad breakup. She then gained strength from her losses to write a new album, with songs consisting of both negative and positive lyrical content. Thus, the album is titled "Subconscious" because "the songs wrote themselves subconsciously".

Samantha also expressed concern writing new songs because she wanted to satisfy her audience. She then started to work with Sebastian Morton again, but he got occupied by another project, so Samantha got in touch with junior high school friend Shane Drasin to produce the remainder of the album.

Singles
The first single was named "Waves of Change" was released on March 2, 2010. The single reached #12 on the billboard chart Dance/Club, and charted for about eight weeks.
The single was produced and the leading track was remixed by Kaskade. The single "Subconscious" was released on iTunes on June 16, 2010. The single was officially released on August 10, 2010.

Track listing

References

2010 albums
Samantha James albums
Chill-out music albums
Albums produced by Sebastian Arocha Morton